= Slobodan Klačar =

Bosnian fitness coach and judoka

Personal information
- Born: 8 December 1981 (age 43); Sarajevo, SFR Yugoslavia
- Height: 1.90 m (6 ft 3 in)
- Weight: 100 kg (220 lb)

Sport
- Country: Bosnia and Herzegovina
- Sport: Judo
- Event: 100kg

Slobodan Klačar (born 8 December 1981) is a Bosnian judoka and three-time national championship winner, football fitness coach and personal trainer. He has been a member of the Bosnia and Herzegovina judo national team and competed in the 2001 World Judo Championships, held in Munich. He had earlier competed for Bosnia and Herzegovina in the World University Judo Championships, held in Moscow in 2004. He is former the head of the physical fitness coaching department of Bosnian football club FK Sarajevo. Former fitness coach at Ceres Negros Football club during the seasons 2018 & 2019. Currently 2020-2021 working as a fitness coach for TFC Terengganu, Malaysian football club playing in the Superleague and the AFC cup.
